Louise F. Cowles   (1842–1924) was an American educator who was the 9th President (Acting) of Mount Holyoke College from 1889 -1890.  She graduated from Mount Holyoke College in 1866 and received a master's degree from Smith College in 1892.  She taught a Mount Holyoke for a number of years before and after becoming president.

See also
Presidents of Mount Holyoke College

References

Mount Holyoke College alumni
Smith College alumni
Mount Holyoke College faculty
Presidents and Principals of Mount Holyoke College
1842 births
1924 deaths
Women heads of universities and colleges
Date of birth missing
Place of birth missing
Date of death missing